Duplicate is a 1998 Indian Hindi-language action comedy film  directed by Mahesh Bhatt. It stars Shahrukh Khan in dual roles, with Juhi Chawla and Sonali Bendre. In this film, Shah Rukh Khan plays a dual role, as Bablu, an aspiring chef and Manu, a notorious gangster. It marked Khan's first of many collaborations with Dharma Productions. Upon release, the film received mixed reviews from critics, and was an average success at the box office. At the 43rd Filmfare Awards, the film received 2 nominations – Best Villain (Khan) and Best Lyricist (Javed Akhtar for "Mere Mehboob Mere Sanam").

Plot
Bablu, a bubbly and childish young man, is an aspiring chef who always prays to God whenever he gets the chance to be one. Meanwhile, Manu who is a very big gangster and a exact duplicate of Bablu is getting chased by the police. Coming back to Bablu, he gets hired as the head chef at a hotel and meets the charming Sonia Kapoor, the hotel catering manager and the hotel's owner who has a crush on Sonia. Bablu falls in love with her as they interact with one another.

One day, when Bablu takes Sonia out for lunch trying to express his feelings, he gets arrested because the police mistake Bablu for Manu. Bablu is able to prove his true identity, but not before Manu hears of his duplicate and decides to take his place by trying to kill him. But Bablu manages to save himself, yet Manu threatens that they have to switch places if he wants to survive so Bablu unwillingly accepts. Soon due to his womanizing nature, Manu flirts with Sonia, but ultimately fails at trying to kiss her. Soon Lily, who is Manu's girlfriend tries to flirt with Bablu thinking him to be Manu but also fails. Soon after, Bablu, who is a very kind man, starts teaching all of Manu's gang members, including Lily about morals.

Now seeing that the light is on in Bablu's home, Manu thinking Bablu is home starts calling for him but really it is Bablu's mother. She thinks Bablu is drunk since Manu who is posing as Bablu is calling out for Bablu, so she scolds him and tells him to go to sleep. Soon they switch back since the police are not looking for Manu anymore. Now Manu, who wants to kill Bablu, calls Bablu's mother and Sonia to a rundown place so they can meet each other so Sonia can now marry him (trapping Bablu). Bablu loses too much money and thinking Manu did it locates him. Since Bablu runs late, he arrives where Sonia and Bablu's mom are waiting. The Police, thinking they have tracked down Manu come and try to arrest him. But Sonia intervenes and tells them they have the wrong guy. Bablu now coming to the location tells the police that is Manu. Manu reappears out of the blue and says he is Bablu. However, Bablu's mom says that Bablu was a big wrestler before he came to Mumbai and she says whoever pulls her to their respective side is the real Bablu. When Bablu sees that his mother's arms are hurting, he decides to let go because he can't bear to see his mother in pain. Now thinking Bablu is Manu, the police grab him but she says that the man holding her is Manu because she knew that Bablu would not dare to try and let his mother bear any pain. But Manu has a gun and tries to shoot her but before he can do that, Lily shoots him dead from behind, and reveals that she informed the police because Bablu taught her how to be a good person. The film ends on a happy note with Bablu and Sonia's wedding.

Cast
Shahrukh Khan as Bablu Chaudhary / Manu Dada (dual role)  
Juhi Chawla as Sonia Kapoor
Sonali Bendre as Lily
Mohnish Behl as Ravi Lamba, Sonia's Hotel Manager.
Farida Jalal as Mrs. Alisha Chaudhary, Bablu's mother whom he lovingly calls "Bebe".
Tiku Talsania as Inspector R.K Thakur
Gulshan Grover as Shalako
Sharat Saxena as Dhingra
Kajol as Simran Singh the girl on the station (uncredited cameo)
Rana Jung Bahadur as Gappa
Vishwajeet Pradhan as Tony (special appearance)
Naushaad Abbas as Henchman

Soundtrack
The songs featured in the film are composed by Anu Malik with lyrics penned by Javed Akhtar. The songs were rendered by Kavita Krishnamurthy, Alka Yagnik,Abhijeet Bhattacharya, Kumar Sanu, Udit Narayan. The songs "Ek Sharaarat (La Lai Lai)" and "Ladna Jhagadna" became hit songs, while "Mere Mehboob Mere Sanam" became one of the Blockbuster Songs of the Year.

Box office 

It is the 12th-highest-grossing Bollywood film of 1998 worldwide.

Overseas

It grossed $375,000 (1.53 crore) in its first week and earned a total of $1 million (4.10 crore) outside India. Overseas, it is the 3rd-highest-grossing Bollywood film of 1998 behind Kuch Kuch Hota Hai ($6.3 million (21.49 crore)) and Dil Se.. ($2.32 million (9.86 crore)), which were also Shah Rukh Khan starrers.

Awards and nominations

1999 Filmfare Awards

Bollywood Movie Awards

Zee Cine Awards

Release
Duplicate's DVD was released by Ultra Media & Entertainment.Duplicate's television premiere occurred on Zee TV.

References

External links
 

1998 films
1990s Hindi-language films
Films about lookalikes
Films scored by Anu Malik
Films shot in the Czech Republic
Films directed by Mahesh Bhatt
Films with screenplays by Robin Bhatt
Films shot in Switzerland
Indian action comedy films
Indian crime comedy films
1998 action comedy films
1990s crime comedy films